Hero Naam Yaad Rakhi is 2015 Punjabi romantic thriller film with story screenplay and dialogues penned by Manoj Jha and directed by Baljit Singh Deo. The film as known is inspired by a real incident that happened in British Columbia.It is a 100minutes format movie. The film features Jimmy Sheirgill opposite Surveen Chawla in lead roles.

Cast
 Jimmy Sheirgill as Hero
 Surveen Chawla as Heena
 Mukul Dev as Jeet (Hero's Brother)
 Shavinder Mahal as Heena's Father
 Jaggi Singh as Angad (Heena's Boyfriend)

Soundtrack

The soundtrack of Hero Naam Yaad Rakhi consists of 9 songs composed by Jatinder Shah, Hitesh Modak, Money Aujla the lyrics of which have been written by Veet Baljit, Inda Raikoti and Pirti Silon.

Reception

Critical response
Divya Pal of CNN-IBN described the film as "far-from-perfect", commenting that the film "could have done a lot better had the director tried his best to create edge-of-seat suspense." Pal also criticized the characters, noting that they "could have been a lot more believable and compelling."

References

External links

Punjabi-language Indian films
2010s Punjabi-language films
Films directed by Baljit Singh Deo
Films scored by Jatinder Shah